Kusano (草野) may refer to:

Kusano, Fukushima, village located in Iwaki District, Fukushima Prefecture
Kusano Station (Fukushima), JR East railway station located in Iwaki, Fukushima Prefecture, Japan
Kusano Station (Hyōgo), train station in Sasayama, Hyōgo Prefecture, Japan

People with the surname
Daisuke Kusano (born 1976), Nippon Professional Baseball player
Hironori Kusano (born 1988), singer, idol, and former member of the J-pop group News
Mitsuyo Kusano (born 1967), female Japanese TV presenter and news anchor
, Japanese footballer

Japanese-language surnames